Lech Andrzej Janerka (born 2 May 1953 in Wrocław, Poland) is a Polish songwriter, vocalist, and bassist. In the 1980s he was leader of a notable Polish post-punk/new wave band called Klaus Mitffoch, based in Wrocław.

Discography

Studio albums

Compilation albums

Live albums

Video albums

References

External links

Official Webpage (in Polish)

1953 births
Living people
Musicians from Wrocław
Polish bass guitarists
Polish songwriters
Polish rock singers
Polish lyricists
20th-century Polish  male singers
21st-century Polish male singers
21st-century Polish singers
Polish atheists
Male bass guitarists
Polish male guitarists